Wolfgang Langewiesche (pronounced:long-gah-vee-shuh; 1907–2002) was an aviator, writer and journalist. He is one of the most quoted writers in aviation writing. His book, Stick and Rudder (1944), is still in print, and is considered a primary reference on the art of flying fixed-wing aircraft.

Born in Düsseldorf, Germany, in 1907, he migrated to America in 1929. He was a graduate of the London School of Economics and earned his master's degree from Columbia University. He was in a doctoral program in the University of Chicago when he decided to learn to fly and pursue a career in aviation.

Mr. Langewiesche wrote for Air Facts magazine, an aviation safety-related publication edited by Leighton Collins, and his articles were the basis for most of Stick and Rudder. The basic facts about flying that he emphasized in 1944 have withstood much criticism since then. Over 200,000 copies of the book had been printed by 1990.

He taught "Theory of Flight" to US Army aviation cadets in the ground school at the Hawthorne School of Aeronautics in Orangeburg, South Carolina, during World War II, and test flew F4U Corsairs for the Vought Corporation.  He later worked for Cessna as a test pilot and contributed several articles for Flying magazine. In the 1950s he became Reader's Digest'''s roving editor, retiring in 1986.

His son, William Langewiesche, is also a well-known author, journalist and pilot with an award-winning career with the Atlantic Monthly and Vanity Fair magazines.

References
 Article in Flying published in October 1976.
 An Article by Bruce Landsberg, Executive Director of the AOPA Air Safety Foundation 

Books authoredI'll take the high road (1939)Stick and Rudder : An Explanation of the Art of Flying, McGraw-Hill, New York, Copyright 1944 & 1972, Lightplane Flying (1939)A flier's world'' (1950)

External links

American aviators
Aviation pioneers
20th-century American non-fiction writers
German emigrants to the United States
1907 births
2002 deaths
American aviation writers
Alumni of the London School of Economics
Columbia University alumni
German flight instructors
20th-century American male writers